Midnight Hour may refer to: 

The midnight hour, the transition time from one day to the next
The Midnight Hour, 1985 comedy/horror TV movie
The Midnite Hour, a 1992 album by Jamie Principle
"The Midnight Hour", 1952 Ray Charles song (Atlantic single) 
"Midnight Hour", 2010 song by Reflection Eternal, single from Revolutions per Minute
"Midnight Hour", song on C. C. Catch album Hear What I Say
 "Midnight Hour" (Skrillex, Boys Noize and Ty Dolla Sign song), 2019

See also 
"In the Midnight Hour", 1965 Wilson Pickett song and soul standard
In the Mid-Nite Hour, 2005 Warren G album
"In the Midnight Hour" (Grey's Anatomy), a 2008 episode of Grey's Anatomy
This Midnight Hour, a composition by Anna Clyne